Hong Kong competed at the 1964 Summer Olympics in Tokyo, Japan. 39 competitors, 38 men and 1 woman, took part in 24 events in 7 sports.

Athletics

 Chu Ming  - Athletics     
 Patrick Field - Athletics     
 William Hill - Athletics     
 So Kam Tong - Athletics

Boxing

 Law Hon Pak (羅漢北)- Men's Bantamweight (51-54 kg)     
 Lee Kam Wah - Men's Flyweight (<51kg)

Cycling

Four cyclists represented Hong Kong in 1964.

 Individual road race
 Chow Kwong Man
 Chow Kwong Choi
 Mok Sau Hei

 Team time trial
 Chow Kwong Choi
 Chow Kwong Man
 Mok Sau Hei
 Michael Watson

 Individual pursuit
 Chow Kwong Choi

Hockey

 Daniel Castro - Hockey     
 Joaquim Collaquo - Hockey     
 Rui da Silva - Hockey     
 Omar Dallah - Hockey     
 José da Cunha - Hockey     
 Packey Gardner - Hockey     
 Lionel Guterres - Hockey     
 Slawee Kadir - Hockey     
 Farid Khan - Hockey     
 Frederic McGosh - Hockey     
 John Monteiro - Hockey     
 Kader Rahman - Hockey     
 João Silva - Hockey     
 Harnam Singh Grewal - Hockey     
 Dillon Singh Sarinder - Hockey     
 Kuldip Singh - Hockey     
 Hussain Zia - Hockey

Sailing

 Paul Cooper (England) - Sailing     
 John Park (Tianjin, China) - Men's Dragon    
 Alan Stevens - Men's Finn  
 William Turnbull (1933 England-?) - Sailing

Shooting

Five shooters represented Hong Kong in 1964.

50 m pistol
 William Gillies
 Hoo Kam Chiu

300 m rifle, three positions
 Reginald Dos Remedios

50 m rifle, three positions
 Peter Rull, Sr.
 Reginald Dos Remedios

50 m rifle, prone
 Henry Souza
 Peter Rull, Sr.

Swimming

 Chan Kam Hong - Swimming
 Li Hin Yu - Swimming     
 Robert Loh (Shanghai, China) - Men's 100 metre freestyle, Men's 400 metre freestyle, Men's 1500 metre freestyle

References

External links
Official Olympic Reports

Nations at the 1964 Summer Olympics
1964 Summer Olympics
1964 in Hong Kong sport